= Enterprise theory =

The enterprise theory of crime understands the organization of criminal behaviour as reflective of specific environmental factors - market or economic forces, influencing the motivations of criminals, how they interact, their perceptions or risk versus benefit, and the efficiency and efficacy of their modus operandi.

Under this theory, organised crime exists because legitimate markets leave many customers and potential customers unsatisfied. High demand for a particular good or service (e.g. drugs, prostitution, arms, slaves), low levels of risk detection and high profits lead to a conducive environment for entrepreneurial criminal groups to enter the market and profit by supplying those goods and services. For success, there must be:

- an identified market; and,
- a certain rate of consumption (demand) to maintain profit and outweigh perceived risks.

Under these conditions competition is discouraged, ensuring criminal monopolies sustain profits. Legal substitution of goods or services may (by increasing competition) force the dynamic of organised criminal operations to adjust, as will deterrence measures (reducing demand), and the restriction of resources (controlling the ability to supply or produce to supply).
